Sir Kenneth Blades Parker (born 20 November 1945), formally styled The Hon. Mr Justice Kenneth Parker, is a former judge of the High Court of England and Wales.

He was educated at Kettering Grammar School and Exeter College, Oxford.

He was called to the bar at Gray's Inn in 1975. He was a judge of the High Court of Justice (Queen's Bench Division) from 2009 to 2015.

In the early 1970s, Sir Kenneth Parker taught law at Oxford. After gaining his BCL, He conducted Jurisprudence lectures with his friend and colleague, Ronald Dworkin. Dworkin was one of the most eminent Legal Philosophers of the last one hundred years, author of 'Taking Rights Seriously' and 'Law's Empire', amongst other famous works.

During the 1980s and 1990s, Sir Kenneth Parker was a star corporate barrister at Monckton Chambers, which he eventually became Head of, in 2003, and remained head until 2009 when he was appointed a High Court Judge. One of his notable cases as an advocate was representing the colorful figure, CEO of Nabisco, F Ross Jonson during its Leveraged Buyout. This story was told in the best-selling book 'Barbarians at the Gate'. 

As a High Court Judge, Sir Kenneth Parker adjudicated on many well-known cases; For example, The Bernie Ecclestone tax evasion trial and the Dale Farm Travellers eviction case. Since retirement, Sir Kenneth Parker has been working for MI6 and GCHQ on International Cybersecurity with the Five Eyes Organisation. He also sits on a panel at the Competition and Markets Authority (CMA), which decides on the legality of large mergers which may affect the Public Interest.

References

1945 births
Living people
Alumni of Exeter College, Oxford
Members of Gray's Inn
Queen's Bench Division judges
Knights Bachelor